Georges Turlier (born 16 July 1931) is a French sprint canoer who competed from the early 1950s to the early 1960s. Competing in two Summer Olympics, he won a gold medal in the C-2 10000 m event at Helsinki in 1952.

References

1931 births
Living people
Canoeists at the 1952 Summer Olympics
Canoeists at the 1960 Summer Olympics
French male canoeists
Olympic canoeists of France
Olympic gold medalists for France
Olympic medalists in canoeing
Medalists at the 1952 Summer Olympics